Ankudinov is a Russian surname. The feminine variant is Ankudinova.

It may refer to:

 Andrey Ankudinov (born 1962), Soviet and Russian actor
 Diana Ankudinova (born 2003), Russian singer
 Ivan Ankudinov (1906 - 1944), Soviet military officer
 Mikhail Ankudinov (1905 - 1974), Soviet general
 Timofey Ankudinov (1617 - 1654), Russian poet

Russian-language surnames